Avenue Road tram stop is a light rail stop in the London Borough of Bromley in the southern suburbs of London. It is located on Avenue Road in a mainly residential area between Penge and Beckenham.

Platforms 
The tram stop is situated on a short passing loop within an otherwise single track section of Tramlink, where that system runs alongside the National Rail line between Crystal Palace and Beckenham Junction stations. The  tram stop has platforms on each side of the two tracks of the loop. The National Rail line passes behind the northernmost of these platforms, but there is no platform on that line.

Services
Avenue Road is served by tram services operated by Tramlink.

On Saturday evenings and Sundays, the service is reduced to a tram every 15 minutes in each direction.

Services are operated using Bombardier CR4000 and Stadler Variobahn Trams.

References

External links

Avenue Road tram Stop – Timetables and live departures at Transport for London
Photo Gallery of Avenue Road stop

Tramlink stops in the London Borough of Bromley